The following is a list of the United States women's national rugby union team international matches.

1980s

1990s

2000s

2010s

2020s

Other matches

References 

Matches
Women's rugby union matches
Women's sport-related lists